John Wilson Gaddy (February 5, 1914 – May 3, 1966), nicknamed "Sheriff", was a professional baseball player who played pitcher in the Major Leagues (MLB) for the Brooklyn Dodgers. He was the starting pitcher in two games for the Dodgers during the final week of the 1938 season.

Gaddy pitched 4 innings in his MLB debut on September 27 debut to earn the victory, 5–1, in the second game of a doubleheader over the New York Giants at Ebbets Field. His other victory came in the final game of the season, pitching a complete game as the Dodgers defeated the Philadelphia Phillies, 7–2, at Shibe Park on October 2.

Gaddy died in an automobile accident in Albemarle, North Carolina.

References

External links

1914 births
1966 deaths
Major League Baseball pitchers
Baseball players from North Carolina
Brooklyn Dodgers players
Road incident deaths in North Carolina
Allentown Brooks players
Dayton Ducks players
Clinton Owls players
Orlando Gulls players
Leesburg Gondoliers players
Palatka Azaleas players
Elmira Pioneers players
Albany Cardinals players
Reidsville Luckies players
Memphis Chickasaws players
Gainesville G-Men players
Leesburg Anglers players
Montgomery Rebels players